This article is part of the history of rail transport by country series

The history of rail transport in Zambia began at the start of the twentieth century.

Northern Rhodesia
The British South Africa Company (BSAC) was responsible for building the Rhodesian railway system in the period of primary construction which ended in 1911, when the main line through Northern Rhodesia reached the Congo border and the Katanga copper mines. Railway construction in British South Africa Company-administered Northern Rhodesia (now Zambia) was undertaken by Rhodesian Railways, established in 1899, as an extension of the system in Southern Rhodesia. Railway development was driven  by Cecil Rhodes, whose original intention was for a railway extending across the Zambesi to Lake Tanganyika, popularly considered as part of a great Cape-Cairo railway linking all the British colonies of Africa. However, Rhodes was as much a capitalist in his motivation as a visionary, and when little gold was found in Mashonaland in Southern Rhodesia, he accepted that the scheme to reach Lake Tanganyika had no economic justification. Railways built by private companies without government subsidies need enough of the type of traffic that can pay high freight rates to recover their construction costs. The agricultural products that fueled much of Rhodesia's early economic growth could not provide this traffic; large quantities of minerals could. Most early railways in Africa were built by the British government rather than Chartered Companies. The need to raise capital and produce dividends prevented most Chartered Companies from undertaking such infrastructure investments. However, in the early period of railway construction, BSAC obtained finance from South African companies including Consolidated Gold Fields and De Beers in which Rhodes was a dominant force. BSAC also benefited from the personal fortunes of Rhodes before his death.

The railway reached Bulawayo in 1897, and was extended to the Victoria Falls in 1902. The first wagons on the line were hauled by oxen, then a single locomotive was conveyed in pieces by cableway across the gorge where the bridge was being built to start up operations to Kalomo in advance of the main line connection.

The next section was to Broken Hill, (now Kabwe), which the railway reached in 1906. BSAC was assured that there would be much traffic from its lead and zinc mines, but this did not materialize because technical mining problems. The railway could not meet the costs of the construction loans, and the company faced major financial problems. The only area likely to generate sufficient mineral traffic to relieve these debts was Katanga. Initially, the Congo Free State had concluded that Katanga's copper deposits were not rich enough to justify the capital cost of building a railway to the coast, but expeditions between 1899 and 1901 proved their value. Copper deposits found in Northern Rhodesia before the First World War proved uneconomic to develop.

In Zambia more lines were built. In the Copperbelt, a connection from Ndola to Chingola via Kitwe was opened approximately parallel to the line in the Belgian Congo. In 1923 to 1924, the Zambezi Sawmills Railway - later Mulobezi Railway - was built as a private railway for the extraction of teak from Mulobezi and Kataba to its north. It linked with several branch lines, and also operated passenger services as far as Kataba. A line from Choma to Masuku was also built in the southwest of the country and three short branch lines in the Copperbelt, leading to Chililabombwe, Mufulira and Luanshya. Until the mid-1960s, sleeper trains went from Ndola via Livingstone to Bulawayo in what was then Southern Rhodesia.

In 1906 Union Minière du Haut Katanga was formed to exploit the Katanga mines. King Leopold favoured a railway route entirely in Congolese territory, linked to the Congo River. However, in 1908, BSAC agreed with Leopold to continue the Rhodesian railway to Elizabethville and the mines. Between 1912, when full-scale copper production began, until 1928 when a Congolese line was completed, almost all of Katanga's copper was shipped over the Rhodesian network to Beira. Even after the Congo route was opened, up to a third of Katanga's copper went to Beira, and the mine's supply of coal and coke mostly came from Wankie, the cheapest available source. This railway's revenue from Katanga enabled it to carry agricultural produce at low rates. Large-scale development of the Copperbelt only began in the late 1920s, with an increasing world market for copper. Transport was no problem as only short branches had to be built to connect the Copperbelt to the main line. In 1929, the Benguela Railway was completed, giving access to the Atlantic port of Benguela. The Benguela Railway provided the shortest, most direct route for copper from both Katanga and Northern Rhodesia, but it was never used to full capacity because both the Congo and the Rhodesias restricted its traffic in favour of their own lines.

When the BSAC administration of the Rhodesias was terminated, an agreement between the Colonial Secretary and the company of 29 September 1923 recognised that BSAC was entitled to protection because of the size of its railway investment in Northern and Southern Rhodesia. The agreement required the governors of each territory to refer any Bill authorizing the construction of new railways or altering the rates that the existing railways charged to the Colonial Secretary. This prevented the legislatures of Northern or Southern Rhodesia from introducing competition or exerting pressure on the BSAC-controlled railways to reduce rates without British government sanction.

European settlers in Northern Rhodesia had two main criticisms of British South Africa Company railway policy. Firstly, that its financial arrangements unfairly benefited the company and its shareholders, and secondly, that the settlers paid for these benefits through exorbitant railway rates. Although the allegations were probably ill-founded, from 1914 onwards, the European settlers called for the replacement of BSAC control of the railways through nationalisation. In 1923 responsible government was achieved, but rather outright nationalisation, the settler government opted for a form of public control under the Railway Act of 1926. This left BSAC as the owner of the railways, which were called Beira and Mashonaland and Rhodesia Railways until 1927, and Rhodesia Railways Limited after. This remained the situation until 1947, when the Rhodesian Government acquired the assets of Rhodesia Railways Limited.

Zambia
In 1964, Northern Rhodesia became independent under the name Zambia. The railway company was divided, and the part belonging to Zambia was renamed Zambia Railways. Traffic between Zambia and Southern Rhodesia - which renamed itself as Rhodesia in November 1965 - was suspended until the foundation of the state of Zimbabwe in April 1980.

TAZARA Railway

From 1964, discussions took place about a proposed railway line between Tanzania and Zambia. The government of the People's Republic of China sponsored construction of the railway specifically to eliminate Zambia's economic dependence on Rhodesia and South Africa. The contractual foundations were closed in 1967, and one year later, the Tanzania-Zambia Railway (TAZARA) was established, as a condominial railway owned by Tanzania and Zambia.

The line was handed over to the company as it was completed in sections in 1973 and 1974.

The TAZARA has been a major economic conduit in the region. However, it has never been profitable and more recently it has suffered from competition from road transport (such as the Trans–Caprivi Highway and Walvis Bay Corridor to Namibia) and the re-orientation of Zambia's economic links towards South Africa after the end of apartheid.  As of October 2008, a Tanzanian newspaper described the TAZARA's condition as being "on the verge of collapse due to financial crisis", with the operator being three months late on paying worker's wages and most of its 12 locomotives being out of service.  At the beginning of 2010 the Chinese government gave the financially crippled operator a US$39 million interest-free loan to revive its operations.

Sena railway 

The subsequent discovery of the Chipata mines in Zambia made it possible to extend the Sena railway from Mchinji, Malawi, to Chipata, Zambia.Project for the Study on Development of the Sena Corridor Final Report/ Chapter 3 Present Situation of Transport System in the Study Area. Jicareport. 2003. The works for this extension were completed in 2019, with Chinese funding. The Sena railway connects with the cities of Lilongwe, Blantyre and Nsanje, in Malawi, and with the cities of Nhamayabué and Dondo, in Mozambique, reaching the port of Beira. Through the Nkaya railway link, in the center of Malawi, it is possible to access the Nacala Railway, where there is access to the Port of Nacala.

See also

History of Zambia
Rail transport in Zambia
Railway Museum (Zambia)

References

Notes

Bibliography

External links
 illustrated account of the development of the railways of Rhodesia

Zambia
Rail
Rail transport in Zambia

de:Schienenverkehr in Sambia#Geschichte